"Sons of the Silent Age" is a song written by David Bowie in 1977 for the album "Heroes". According to Brian Eno, it was the only song on the album composed prior to the recording sessions, all others being improvised in the Hansa by the Wall studio. Bowie himself indicated that Sons of the Silent Age could at one stage have been the title for the album, rather than "Heroes".

Biographer David Buckley remarked on the song's "doomy sax-driven verses set incongruously aside cheesy choruses". The lyrics have been interpreted as a third-person revisitation of the themes of psychotic withdrawal explored on Bowie's previous album Low ("Pacing their rooms just like a cell’s dimensions"), as well as referencing the characters from his 1970 song "The Supermen" ("They never die they just go to sleep one day") on the album The Man Who Sold the World. Author Nicholas Pegg speculated that the lines "platforms, blank looks, no books" and "rise for a year or two then make war" alluded to the Nazi regime.

Other releases

 Bowie performed this song live during his 1987 Glass Spider Tour and it appears as a live track on the Glass Spider live album and video. On this version of the song, the chorus is sung by the band's lead guitarist Peter Frampton
 It appeared in the Sound + Vision box set (1989)

Cover versions

 Philip Glass – "Heroes" Symphony (1996)
 Danny Michel – Loving the Alien: Danny Michel Sings the Songs of David Bowie (2004)
 Shearwater – as part of a live performance of the entire Berlin Trilogy for WNYC (2018)

Notes

David Bowie songs
1977 songs
Songs written by David Bowie
Song recordings produced by Tony Visconti
Song recordings produced by David Bowie